Peter Sinks is a natural sinkhole in northern Utah that is one of the coldest places in the contiguous United States.

Due to temperature inversions that trap cold nighttime air, it routinely produces the lowest temperatures in the contiguous United States. Even in the summer, the bottom of the sinkhole rarely goes four consecutive days without freezing. It is so cold near the bottom of the hole that trees are unable to grow.

Peter Sinks' meteorological significance was discovered by Utah State University student Zane Stephens in 1983. Stephens, along with the Utah Climate Center, placed measuring instruments in the valley in the winter of 1984. Stephens hiked into Middle Sink along with Burns Israelsen to record the temperature personally. He then flew into Peter Sinks in a KUTV television station helicopter with broadcasting meteorologist Mark Eubank. State climatologist Gayle Bingham also traveled to the area and confirmed the temperature. The alcohol thermometer being used was retrieved and sent to the Bureau of Standards in Washington, D.C. to confirm the temperature.

Since 1985, Peter Sinks and Middle Sink have been studied extensively by Stephens and Tim Wright with the use of Campbell Scientific weather equipment. Stephens and Wright's main study is the change in temperature through the inversion at these sites. These valleys act like a dam trapping cold air, with the coldest of the air settling to the bottom of the valley.

Climate
Peter Sinks, sitting at an elevation of 8,164 feet, is a natural limestone sinkhole approximately one-half mile wide in diameter and has no valley outlet (referred to as dolines geologically) to drain water or air. It is one of the coldest spots in the lower 48.

During calm cloudless nights, this high elevation basin dissipates daytime heat rapidly into the atmosphere. Cool dense air can then slide downwards towards the basin floor in a process known as cold air pooling. Consequently, extremely low temperatures can occur, particularly in the wake of arctic fronts in winter. According to the Köppen climate classification, it has a continental subalpine/subarctic climate, abbreviated Dfc, though the exceptional attributes of this climate preclude one of the hallmark features of the climate type, the boreal forest, which as Köppen based the system around vegetation distribution indicates that Peter Sinks stretches the limits of the system.

See also 
 List of sinkholes of the United States

References

External links 
 Peter Sinks - Utah Climate Center - real-time temperature monitoring of Peter Sinks and rim temperatures. Maintained by the Utah Climate Center
 Peter Sinks Temperature Monitoring Project - current project by Utah State University for onsite remote automated monitoring at Peter Sinks
 Peter Sinks Field Experiment by John Horel in 1999 - includes map and photos
 

Mountain meteorology
Protected areas of Cache County, Utah
Sinkholes of the United States
Landforms of Cache County, Utah